Isatou Ceesay (born 1972) is a Gambian activist and social entrepreneur, popularly referred to as the Queen of Recycling. She initiated a recycling movement called One Plastic Bag in the Gambia. Through this movement, she educated women in The Gambia to recycle plastic waste into sellable products that earned them income.

Early years and education 
Growing up on a farm in the small and underdeveloped village of N’jau in Gambia, Isatou  Ceesay had to battle the challenges of being raised in a third world environment. Due to her father's passing, as well as cultural limitations for women at the time, Ceesay was unable to complete a proper traditional education and was forced to drop out of school- for it was unaffordable at the time- and instead was forced to do work making and selling toys by using small scraps of clothing and wood, which made her popular amongst young locals[1]. With the money she’d worked for, along with her small inheritance, Ceesay managed to pay for herself to attend the Gambia Technical institute[1], where she trained as a secretary, and even joined the US Peace Corps to gain further knowledge on potential ways she could work on her community back home.

Career 
Almost twenty years later, she one day came to notice just how ridiculed even the main streets of N’jau were plagued with high piles of trash, consisting of all forms from discarded plastics, tins, tires, house waste, and especially plastic bags, surrounded with puddles of water and malaria-infected mosquitoes[1,3]. Worst of all, the people of the village would have playgrounds, food markets and animal feeding grounds next to these piles, unaware of the harm in which they were putting themselves at risk. Because of  this, animal deaths from consuming plastic plagued the village, as well as outbreaks of malaria and other diseases, dominated her village because there was no established system in place for trash disposal other than throwing it outside behind their homes[1,2]. Furthermore, because of poverty and desperation, people were starting to burn these plastic bags as fuel for warmth and cooking [1,2], and this was Ceesay’s call to action that something had to change. Using her gained knowledge of recycling and upcycling from the Peace Corps, together with her local women’s group, Ceesay brought to life the idea of reusing these plastic bags to make purses that could be sold for money. They would gather the plastic bags, dry them out and tear them into small yarn like threads called ‘plarn’ which they would weave into small hand held bags[1,2]. The process would utilize about ten plastic bags to make each of their bags[1,3], but even with this achievement societal norms were still against them for it was improper for women to be working and created ridicule was seen as improper to be digging through trash instead of doing typical household work and because they were all women, it also raised questions on their ability to execute[1]. Despite all this Ceesay remained determined and took her products to a nearby city to sell, and managed to sell out the first batch. With this, the business continued to grow and succeed and managed to create an income for the women of the village, who were now able to take care of their families and this continued growth led to the birth of the N’jau Recycling and Income Generation Group (NRIGG)[1,3]. Ceesay did not stop there however, she continued to help the women prosper by helping them manage this wealth and open bank accounts, and even went on to build a skill center in N’jau that would bring women together and help them work on broader lifestyle and professional skills[1]. Today, the center and model still continue to grow, as they have continued to turn different types of waste into different products including compost, jewelry, beads, armchairs, stools  and has even expanded into selling to bigger markets including the United States[1].
The project was recently recognised as an official community-based organisation in the Gambia, now referred to as the Njau Recycling and Income Generation Group (NRIGG). Today, Ceesay works with more than 11,00 people and NRIGG is based in four separate communities across The Gambia.

Awards and recognition 

 2012- She was honoured with The International Alliance for Women Difference Maker award in Washington DC, United States
 Her story was published in a book authored by Miranda Paul and Illustrated by Elizabeth Zunon

References
[1]Dyu, L. (2019, October 3). Isatou Ceesay and the women turning waste to wealth. Climate Heroes. Retrieved December 6, 2022, from https://climateheroes.org/isatou-ceesay-turning-waste-to-wealth/ 
[2]All facts for Kids about Isatou Ceesay. Easy Science For Kids. (2018, August 8). Retrieved December 6, 2022, from https://easyscienceforkids.com/isatou-ceesay/ 
[3]Sedlock, C. (2019, March 15). Women's History Month: Isatou Ceesay. Apeel Blog. Retrieved December 6, 2022, from https://blog.apeelsciences.com/womens-history-month-isatou-ceesay 

Living people
1972 births
Gambian activists
Gambian women
Women activists